Bintou Touré is a Guinean politician in the National Assembly (Guinea). Bintou is a member of the Minority Guinean Party for Progress and Development, and is President of the Commission for Health-Youth-Sports-Art and Culture.

References

Members of the National Assembly (Guinea)
Living people
Year of birth missing (living people)